Garry Dulson (born 21 December 1953) is an English former footballer. He played 148 league games in a six-year career in the Football League.

A defender, he began his career with Nottingham Forest. He did not play a first team game for Forest, and so was sold on to Port Vale in November 1974 for a £5,000 fee. He spent four years with the Vale, before he was moved on to Crewe Alexandra in December 1978. He transferred to non-league side Northwich Victoria in 1980, and later played for Stafford Rangers, Boston United, and Eastwood.

Career

Port Vale
Dulson started his career at Nottingham Forest, before joining Third Division club Port Vale on loan in October 1974, and signing permanently for £5,000 the next month. He fared poorly in the FA Cup, scoring an own goal in a 2–2 draw with Lincoln City at Vale Park, before getting sent off in the replay at Sincil Bank after punching Dick Krzywicki. He ended the 1974–75 season with 34 appearances to his name. Dulson scored his first senior goal on 13 September 1975, in a 3–3 draw with Southend United at Roots Hall; he got his second in a 2–1 win over Rotherham United at Millmoor on 6 March 1976. He played a total of 34 games in 1975–76. He lost his first-team place to John Ridley at the start of the 1976–77 season, but after John Ridley picked up an injury Dulson managed to establish himself as David Harris's centre-back partner and picked up the club's Sportsman of the Year trophy, whilst Harris was named as overall Player of the Year. Dulson bagged his third and final career goal in a 1–1 home draw with Tranmere Rovers on 16 April 1977, and ended the 1976–77 campaign with 29 appearances to his name. He played 22 games in 1977–78, but manager Roy Sproson was replaced by Bobby Smith in October 1977, and Dulson fell out of the first team picture.

Crewe Alexandra and later career
He was loaned out to Crewe Alexandra in November 1978, before joining Warwick Rimmer's side permanently the next month. The "Railwaymen" finished bottom of the Fourth Division in 1978–79, and second-from-bottom in 1979–80 under the stewardship of Tony Waddington. Dulson moved into non-league football with Alliance Premier League side Northwich Victoria; he later played for Stafford Rangers, Boston United and Eastwood.

Career statistics
Source:

References

1953 births
Living people
Footballers from Nottingham
English footballers
Association football defenders
Nottingham Forest F.C. players
Port Vale F.C. players
Crewe Alexandra F.C. players
Northwich Victoria F.C. players
Stafford Rangers F.C. players
Boston United F.C. players
Eastwood Hanley F.C. players
English Football League players
National League (English football) players